Baños Canton is a canton of Ecuador, located in the Tungurahua Province.  Its capital is the town of Baños.  Its population at the 2010 census was 20,018. The population of Banos in 2011 was 21,140

References

Cantons of Tungurahua Province